Emilio Petiva (January 30, 1890 in Turin — 17 September 1980 in Turin) was an Italian cyclist.

Palmares

1910
 National Road Champion
3rd Milano-Modena
1913
2nd Milano-Modena
2nd Coppa Casalegno
1914
8th Giro di Lombardia
1919
2nd Tour des Alpes 
1920
Tour des Alpes 
2nd Turin-Genoa
3rd Giro dell'Emilia
4th Giro d’Italia
1921
3rd Genoa-Nice
8th Giro di Lombardia
1922
2nd Milano–Torino
3rd Rome-Naples-Rome
1923
3rd Giro del Veneto
8th Giro d'Italia
1924
Coppa Placci
2nd Milano-Modena
2nd Coppa Cavacciocchi
1925
Coppa Placci
1926
Giro dell'Umbria

References

External links

1890 births
1980 deaths
Italian male cyclists
Cyclists from Turin